Octavio Solis (born 1958) is an American playwright and director whose plays have been produced and show theaters and small companies across the United States. He has written over 25 plays, including his most famous works: Lydia, Santos & Santos and Man of the Flesh. His works have earned numerous awards and grants.

Life and career
Born in El Paso, Texas, to Mexican parents, Solis started his career in theater by joining his high school, Riverside High School's (El Paso, TX) theater group when he was fourteen. He received a BFA at Trinity University and went on to earn his MFA at Trinity University's off-campus program at the Dallas Theatre Center. After college, while acting in Eric Overmyer's Native Speech in Dallas, Solis was inspired to write his own plays rather than act in them. In between acting and writing, he taught high school students. He moved to San Francisco in 1989 to further his career, as he felt he was "hitting a glass ceiling" in Dallas, and felt that California would be a good place to participate in the "Mexican American experience".

Solis uses his experiences in life to help create and shape his plays, often drawing directly from his time in El Paso, where he states that he was able to see both the first-world and the third-world from his backyard. In his play Lydia, which focuses on a working-class Mexican-American family and an undocumented maid who arrives in the broken home, he draws upon his own experiences as a Latino living only a mile from the Rio Grande.

Solis was a "cultural consultant" for the Disney film Coco. He voices an Arrival Agent in the film and its spinoff short.

Contributions to Latino Theatre

Octavio Solis has made a large number of contributions to the Latino Theatre community, namely in the number of works he has created that are designed to be for and played by Latino/as. One of his most critically acclaimed works, Lydia, focuses on a Latino family and their maid who recently came from Mexico to work in the states. His importance in the Latino/a community have been widely recognized, as evident by his numerous awards such as his National Latino Playwriting Award and his being awarded the Henry Award for Outstanding New Play. He has also received a number of grants and funds, including the New Works Fund Grant from the Theatre Bay Area and the Kennedy Center Fund for New American Plays.

Awards

Works

Books
Retablos: Stories From a Life Lived Along the Border, City Lights, 2018

References

External links
 

1958 births
Living people
American people of Mexican descent
Hispanic and Latino American dramatists and playwrights
People from El Paso, Texas